Călin Chirilov is a Moldovan footballer who plays for Italian club San Salvo, as a defender.

Notes

References

External links

1998 births
Living people
Moldovan footballers
Association football defenders
Moldovan Super Liga players
FC Zimbru Chișinău players